The Shaanxi Xinda Wolves are a Chinese professional men's basketball club based in Weinan, Shaanxi, playing in the National Basketball League (NBL). The team won the 2015, 2017 and 2018 NBL championships.

Current roster

References

Sport in Shaanxi
Basketball teams in China